Events from the year 1762 in Great Britain.

Incumbents
 Monarch – George III
 Prime Minister – Thomas Pelham-Holles, 1st Duke of Newcastle (Whig) (until 26 May); John Stuart, 3rd Earl of Bute (Tory) (starting 26 May)
 Parliament – 12th

Events

 January – the "Cock Lane ghost" appears in London.
 4 January – Britain declares war on Spain and Naples.
 February – 12 sperm whales strand on the east coast of England.
 10 March – Seven Years' War – Britain captures Grenada from France.
 20 March  –  debut performance of David Garrick's The Farmer's Return from London at the Theatre Royal in Drury Lane.
 23 March – first legitimately constituted Sandemanian congregation in England, at Glover's Hall in London, as an offshoot of the Scottish Glasite sect.
 May – Thomas Pelham-Holles, 1st Duke of Newcastle-upon-Tyne resigns and is succeeded as Prime Minister by John Stuart, 3rd Earl of Bute, the first Scottish Prime Minister of Great Britain; a large number of Newcastle's 'Old Corps Whig' followers are dismissed from public office in the following months in what is known facetiously as the "Massacre of the Pelhamite Innocents".
 22 May – royal family first takes up residence at Buckingham House.
 5 June – John Wilkes founds the radical newspaper The North Briton.
 24 June – Seven Years' War: At the Battle of Wilhelmsthal, the Anglo-Hanoverian army of Ferdinand of Brunswick defeats the French forces in Westphalia. The British commander Lord Granby distinguishes himself.
 mid-July–24 November – Seven Years' War: British troops reinforce the Portuguese to resist the Invasion of Portugal by Spain.
 13 August – Seven Years' War: The Battle of Havana concludes after more than two months with the surrender of Havana to Britain by Spain.
 September – Society for Equitable Assurances on Lives and Survivorships is founded in London. The world's oldest mutual insurer, it pioneers age-based premiums based on the mortality rate.
 15 September – French and Indian War – Battle of Signal Hill – British troops defeat the French in the last battle of the North American theatre of the Seven Years' War, fought in the Newfoundland Colony.
 24 September–6 October – Seven Years' War: Battle of Manila fought between Great Britain and Spain resulting in the British occupation of the Philippines until 1764. The British take Manila and make it an Open Port.
 November – first recorded mention of the sandwich.

Undated
 Admiral John Ross of Balnagowan Castle initiates land tenure reform in the Scottish Highlands which will evolve into the Highland Clearances.
 Building of the Plymouth Synagogue, the oldest built by Ashkenazi Jews in the English-speaking world.
 The last remaining buildings are cleared from London Bridge.
 Composer Johann Christian Bach arrives in London where he will spend the remaining 20 years of his life.

Publications
 William Williams Pantycelyn's Mor o Wydr (including "Gweddi am Nerth i fyned trwy anialwch y Byd", the Welsh original of the hymn "Cwm Rhondda").
 Laurence Sterne's collected sermons The Sermons of Mr. Yorick.
 James Stuart and Nicholas Revett's architectural treatise Antiquities of Athens.

Births
 31 January – Lachlan Macquarie, Scottish-born British Army officer and Governor of New South Wales (died 1824)
 12 February – Solomon Hirschell, chief rabbi of the United Kingdom (died 1842)
 17 March (bapt.) – William Dawes, Royal Marines officer and colonial administrator (died 1836)
 12 August – King George IV of the United Kingdom (died 1830)
 11 September – Joanna Baillie, Scottish-born poet and dramatist (died 1851)
 24 September – William Lisle Bowles, poet and critic (died 1850)
 21 October – George Colman the Younger, dramatist and miscellaneous writer (died 1836)
 1 November – Spencer Perceval, Prime Minister of the United Kingdom (assassinated 1812)

Deaths
 3 February – Beau Nash, dandy (born 1674)
 23 June – Charles Cornwallis, 1st Earl Cornwallis (died 1700)
 13 July – James Bradley, English Astronomer Royal (born 1693)
 28 July – George Dodington, 1st Baron Melcombe, English politician (born 1691)
 21 August – Lady Mary Wortley Montagu, English writer (born 1689)

References

 
Years in Great Britain